Rubcowo  is a village in the administrative district of Gmina Płaska, within Augustów County, Podlaskie Voivodeship, in north-eastern Poland, close to the border with Belarus.

The village has a population of 120.

During the German occupation of Poland (World War II), on November 24, 1939, four Polish foresters from Rubcowo were murdered by the Germans in the prison in Suwałki as part of the Intelligenzaktion.

References

Rubcowo